Vivek Sagar is an Indian music composer, record producer and playback singer who works in Telugu cinema. He debuted with the film, Pelli Choopulu (2016). Upon critical acclaim for the album garnered him his first nomination for Filmfare Award for Best Music Director – Telugu at 64th Filmfare Awards South.

He scored for Sammohanam (2018) and garnered his second nomination for Filmfare Award for Best Music Director – Telugu at 66th Filmfare Awards South. The same year, he again collaborated with Pelli Choopulu director Tharun Bhascker for Ee Nagaraniki Emaindi.

Life
Vivek Sagar has done his schooling at All Saints High School in Hyderabad. Sagar studied Electronics and communications engineering before embarking on a career in music. He began his career as a music composer with a short film, Sainma.

Vivek married Keerthi Surya Seethalam in 2021.

Career
His first full-length film and his first Telugu film production was Pelli Choopulu. He has stated that he believes music should be custom-written for the movie's story and that he will avoid "commercial music".

Discography

As composer

As playback singer 
 2020: "Sanchari" (Hyderabad Gig)
 2020: "Saami Saami" (Chivaraku Migiledhi)
 2021: "Jatha Kalisina" (from the OST of Kirayi Hanthakudu / Story Discussion 2)
 2020: "Dorakadendi Ra" ( from Kotha Poradu web series)

References

External links 

Telugu film score composers
Indian male film score composers
21st-century Indian composers
Living people
21st-century male musicians
1989 births
Musicians from Hyderabad, India
Alumni of All Saints High School, Hyderabad